St. Magdalene distillery was a producer of single malt Scotch whisky that operated between 1798 and 1983.

History
St. Magdalene was established at least by 1798 (and possibly as early as 1765). During its early life, it was known as "Linlithgow" after the town in which it was built, and was originally located at Bonnytoun. It moved to the St. Magdalene site in 1834, to be close to the Union Canal. Before the distillery existed, the site was home to a leper colony, convent, and hospital at various points in time between the 12th century and the distillery's 18th-century founding. The distillery took its name from St Magdalene's Hospital, a lazar house which once stood upon the site.

For the majority of the 19th century the distillery was run by the Dawson family, initially by Adam Dawson (1747–1836), who had trained as a maltster and was the youngest son of a sheep farmer from Kippendavie near Dunblane. Adam Dawson and his wife Frances McKell had ten children, including James Dawson the prominent champion of Aboriginal interests. Another son, John Dawson (1796–1878), continued the distillery business along with his brother Adam Dawson Jnr (1793–1873). By 1856 the distillery was capable of producing  of whisky per week, and employed around 30 people. The sale of the distillery to Distillers Company in 1912, was brought about by the untimely death in January 1912 of John Kellie Dawson, son of Adam Dawson Jnr, from meningitis at the age of 43.  St. Magdalene was renovated in 1927.

After St. Magdalene closed in 1983, some of the buildings were converted into apartments. They retained their distinctive pagoda roofs, and are protected as category C listed buildings.

References

External links
St Magdalene Scotch Whisky Distillery: St Magdalene Distillery, Linlithgow, ScotchWhisky.net

1798 establishments in Scotland
1983 disestablishments in Scotland
Scottish malt whisky
Distilleries in Scotland
Category C listed buildings in West Lothian
Listed distilleries in Scotland
British companies disestablished in 1983
British companies established in 1798